Christian Eric "Chip" McCaw (born March 24, 1973) is an American former Olympic volleyball player. Hailing from Pepperdine University, he represented the United States at the 2000 Summer Olympics. He was married to model Amber Valletta from September 2003 to the beginning of 2015, and together they have a son, who was born in 2000.

References

Living people
1973 births
American men's volleyball players
Pepperdine University alumni
Volleyball players at the 2000 Summer Olympics
Olympic volleyball players of the United States
Pepperdine Waves men's volleyball players